Francisco Javier Castaño Allende (born 29 December 1972) is a Spanish retired footballer who played as a midfielder.

He amassed La Liga totals of 121 games and seven goals over six seasons, representing in the competition Sporting de Gijón, Logroñés, Numancia and Betis. He added 150 matches and 23 goals in Segunda División, where he appeared for all the clubs but the first.

Club career
Born in Gijón, Asturias, Castaño alternated between La Liga and Segunda División during his first 13 years as a senior. He made his debut in the former competition on 2 June 1991 with Sporting de Gijón, coming on as a 68th minute substitute in a 3–0 home win against RCD Español; he scored his first goal in the Spanish top flight on 27 March 1994, contributing to a 2–1 victory over RC Celta de Vigo also at El Molinón.

Castaño promoted to the top level three times during his professional career, with CD Logroñés in 1996, CD Numancia in 1999 and Real Betis in 2001, netting a combined 17 goals in the process. He also suffered relegation with the second side in 1997.

In 2003, aged nearly 31, Castaño left Levante UD. He went on to play a further 11 seasons in his native region, with Astur CF, UP Langreo, UC Ceares, Marino de Luanco and CD Lealtad, competing in Segunda División B and Tercera División.

In July 2015, Castaño returned to Sporting de Gijón as youth coach.

References

External links

La Segunda B profile 

1972 births
Living people
Footballers from Gijón
Spanish footballers
Association football midfielders
La Liga players
Segunda División players
Segunda División B players
Tercera División players
Sporting de Gijón B players
Sporting de Gijón players
CD Logroñés footballers
CD Numancia players
Real Betis players
Levante UD footballers
UP Langreo footballers
UC Ceares players
Marino de Luanco footballers
CD Lealtad players
Spain youth international footballers
Spain under-21 international footballers